Birshtein is a surname. Notable people with the surname include:

Boris Birshtein (born 1947), Lithuanian businessman
Tatiana Birshtein (born 1928), Russian scientist